The 2012 European Grand Prix (formally, the 2012 Formula 1 Grand Prix of Europe) was a Formula One motor race that was held at the Valencia Street Circuit in Valencia, Spain on 24 June 2012. It was the eighth round of the 2012 championship season, and the final time the circuit hosted the European Grand Prix. It was Fernando Alonso's second Grand Prix win in Spain after the 2006 Spanish Grand Prix held at Barcelona. Michael Schumacher finished third at the age of 43 years and 173 days, the oldest driver to climb to the podium since Jack Brabham's second-place finish at the 1970 British Grand Prix. It was Schumacher's best result since his comeback in 2010 and the final podium finish of his Formula One career.

Report

Background
After experimenting with two drag reduction system (DRS) zones with a single detection point in 2011, the FIA decided that the 2012 race would use a single, longer DRS zone, mirroring the approach used in Canada. The detection point was positioned on the approach to Turn 8, with the activation point located between Turn 10 and Turn 11, and was brought forward  from its position in the 2011 race, allowing drivers to activate the system sooner. The second DRS activation zone, located after Turn 14 in 2011, was removed for the 2012 race.

Like the 2011 European Grand Prix, tyre supplier Pirelli brought its white-banded medium compound tyre as the harder "prime" tyre and the yellow-banded soft compound tyre as the softer "option" tyre.

Qualifying
Marussia driver Timo Glock decided not to take part in Saturday's qualifying session or start the race because he was suffering from food poisoning. His teammate, Charles Pic, qualified in twenty-third and last place. The HRTs occupied the row in front of him on the grid, with Pedro de la Rosa out-qualifying Narain Karthikeyan. The Red Bull of Mark Webber was very out of place, qualifying in nineteenth due to hydraulic problems which meant he could not use the DRS rear wing. The Caterham of Vitaly Petrov qualified on the same row as Webber in twentieth, whilst the Toro Rosso of Jean-Éric Vergne qualified eighteenth again.

The other Toro Rosso of Daniel Ricciardo did make it through to the second qualifying session, but ended up on the same row as his teammate in seventeenth. Caterham driver Heikki Kovalainen, doing a great job to make Q2, enjoyed his joint-best qualifying of the season in sixteenth, in front of Ricciardo. He was, however, more than a second behind Sergio Pérez of Sauber, who took fifteenth spot on the grid. Ferrari made a strategical error in choosing to use just one set of soft tyres for their drivers, resulting in Fernando Alonso qualifying eleventh, and Felipe Massa setting the thirteenth quickest time. Williams driver and fellow countryman Bruno Senna qualified on the same row as Massa, in fourteenth. Just three-tenths of a second separated Romain Grosjean's fastest time of the session, and Massa's thirteenth fastest time, proving the competitiveness of the 2012 field. The Mercedes of Michael Schumacher was the car between the Ferraris in twelfth, missing out, like Senna and Pérez, when their teammates made it into Q3.

Seven teams were represented by the ten drivers in the third and final part of qualifying. Sebastian Vettel took his second pole position of the season by four-tenths of a second; it was also the 33rd pole position of his career, meaning that he moved up into joint third with Alain Prost and Jim Clark in the all time list for most pole positions. It was Vettel's third consecutive pole at the Valencia Street Circuit, on the track's final appearance. It was much closer behind him though, the other nine cars separated by just half a second. Lewis Hamilton accompanied him by qualifying second, his fifth front row start of the season, and the seventh time he had initially qualified there. Pastor Maldonado impressed by qualifying third, eleven places in front of his teammate, and also in front of the two Lotus cars, who qualified fourth and fifth with Grosjean marginally ahead of Kimi Räikkönen. Nico Rosberg took his Mercedes to sixth and Kamui Kobayashi was successful in qualifying his Sauber seventh. Rosberg claimed after the session that Hamilton had blocked him at the end of his out-lap, spoiling his final effort. The matter was looked into by the stewards, but they decided not to take further action. Nico Hülkenberg, in the improved Force India, narrowly missed out on a higher grid slot in eighth, as Jenson Button bemoaned oversteer in his McLaren again and was down in ninth. Paul di Resta's lap looked promising (he had predicted a top five grid slot had it all gone to plan), but he made a small mistake at the final corner of the lap and ended up down in tenth. Six of the drivers in the top ten actually set a faster time in Q2 than they did in Q3. The four drivers who did not were Vettel, Hamilton, Maldonado and Räikkönen.

Unusually for the 2012 season, all of the drivers started the race in the same places they qualified because no penalties were implemented.

Race
The top 10 qualifiers all started on the soft 'option' tyres which they used in Q3, as did most of those behind, though they had a choice. Michael Schumacher, Sergio Pérez and Mark Webber were the three who started on the medium tyres.

Just like in the previous race in Canada, polesitter Sebastian Vettel was able to get a powerful launch off the startline in his Red Bull and went into the first corner unchallenged, and Lewis Hamilton who was alongside him on the front row stayed second. Kimi Räikkönen got a good launch from 5th on the grid and was nearly alongside third place starter Pastor Maldonado but had to back off to avoid hitting him and his Lotus teammate Romain Grosjean took advantage to jump into third, and Kamui Kobayashi took 4th, as Maldonado and Räikkönen dropped to 5th and 6th. The Ferraris of Fernando Alonso and Felipe Massa were the chief gainers on the first lap, Alonso moving from 11th on the grid to 8th and Massa from 13th to 10th. Force India were also running strongly at the end of the first lap, with Nico Hülkenberg and Paul di Resta splitting the Ferraris in 7th and 9th. The two men who lost out at the start were Nico Rosberg, who dropped to 11th from 6th on the grid and was just a single place in front of Mercedes teammate Michael Schumacher, and Jenson Button in the second McLaren who lost four places and was down in 13th.

Vettel showed very impressive pace in the early stages of the race, building a 4-second lead within the first two laps and continuing to extend it at a second per lap. Hamilton was unable to keep up with him and was defending from Grosjean, with Kobayashi, Maldonado and Räikkönen all able to keep up. Hülkenberg dropped to 3 seconds behind Räikkönen and was kept busy in the opening laps keeping Alonso behind. The order stayed the same till lap 10 when Grosjean used the DRS to get alongside Hamilton before completing a move around the outside of turns 12 and 13. He immediately pulled away from the McLaren driver, though Vettel was already 14 seconds ahead, but on a clear track he was able to run lap times that were within two to three-tenths of Vettel's. On the next lap, Alonso passed Hülkenberg for seventh with a similar move.

Button, down in 12th place, was the first driver to make his pit stop for new tyres, doing so on lap 11, and he went for the medium compound whereas Massa, who was held up behind and unable to pass di Resta went for the soft tyre when he pitted one lap later. Maldonado was suffering from tyre wear towards the end of this stint, and was passed by Räikkönen and then Alonso, with the latter duo then setting off after Kobayashi. Kobayashi immediately decided to pit, with Räikkönen and Maldonado following him in. A minor pit stop problem for Kobayashi allowed Räikkönen to get ahead of him but Alonso was able to jump the duo of them by staying out a lap longer. Vettel and Grosjean pitted on lap 15, with the defending world champion rejoining still in the lead.

Grosjean and Hamilton rejoined behind di Resta and Rosberg, who did not pit, but neither offered much resistance to them, and soon the duo were back up to second and third, though Grosjean was now 20 seconds behind Vettel. The rest of the early stoppers were stuck behind the trio of Schumacher, Bruno Senna in the other Williams and Mark Webber, all three of whom were yet to stop, and losing pace on their worn tyres, created a massive traffic jam as a number of drivers, led by Alonso with Räikkönen, Kobayashi, Maldonado, Massa, Hülkenberg, Button and Sergio Pérez were all close behind. Alonso was able to clear the trio, passing Webber and Senna in the space of a few corners, and Schumacher on the next lap. Schumacher and Webber both stopped for new tyres at the end of the lap, leaving Senna to hold off the rest of the cars on new tyres. Räikkönen passed Senna almost immediately, and Kobayashi attacked Senna on the long straight before Turn 8. Senna was unaware that Kobayashi was already moving down the inside and tried to defend the inside line, and the duo touched, with Kobayashi's front wing being damaged and Senna suffering a puncture, and both men had to come into the pits.

At the front, Grosjean was able to match Vettel's pace for the first time in the race, though the German was able to hold the gap at 20 seconds. Hamilton was unable to keep up with the leading duo, with Alonso and Räikkönen both making short work of di Resta and started to close in on Hamilton. Di Resta finally pitted on lap 25 and went on the medium compound tyres, promoting Maldonado to sixth, with Massa, Hülkenberg, Button and Pérez completing the top 10, all having made one stop. Massa, Button and Pérez all had to make an early second stop for tyres in the next few laps as they were the earliest to make their first.

The complexion of the race took a big turn when, on lap 27, well down the field, Jean-Éric Vergne tried to make a DRS-assisted pass on Heikki Kovalainen through turn 12. Vergne thought that his car was fully in front of Kovalainen but it actually wasn't and he ended up chopping his car straight onto Kovalainen's, puncturing his right rear tyre and Kovalainen's left front, and debris caused by the shredding tyres was spread all over the track, thus causing the intervention of the safety car. Both Vergne and Kovalainen made it to the pits, with Vergne retiring due to suspension damage whereas Kovalainen was able to continue.

The intervention of the safety car not only just bunched up the field, erasing Vettel's 20 second lead at the front, but also sent most of the drivers, including all the leaders, in for their second tyre stop. There was more pit-stop trouble for Lewis Hamilton, as a problem with the front jack meant that he dropped behind both Alonso and Räikkönen after the stops. The safety car intervention also meant that Massa, Button and Pérez, the trio who made their second stops before it came out, lost a lot of places as most of the drivers were able to stop under the safety car, this left the trio down in 14th, 15th and 16th. The drivers that did not stop in this period were Daniel Ricciardo and those that had made their first stop late – Rosberg, Schumacher, Webber and di Resta. This put Ricciardo into 4th place, behind Vettel, Grosjean and Alonso. Räikkönen was fifth, and Hamilton sixth after his pit stop troubles.

The race restarted on lap 34, and Alonso immediately took the opportunity to get alongside Grosjean and pass him round the outside at turn 1. Rosberg, in seventh and on the older tyres immediately lost five places to teammate Schumacher, Webber, Maldonado, Hülkenberg and di Resta. Further down the pack, there was a collision between Massa and Kobayashi while battling for 13th, leaving Massa with a puncture and Kobayashi with terminal suspension damage. At around the same time, race leader Vettel lost drive coming out of turn 10 and he had to retire, with what was later said to be an alternator failure. Alonso took the lead ahead of Grosjean, and Ricciardo ran third briefly as Hamilton passed Räikkönen for fourth. Ricciardo's tyres did not last long, and soon, after being passed by both Hamilton and Räikkönen, he had to pit for new tyres.

Schumacher was running fifth now ahead of Webber, but the latter was suffering from serious tyre problems and, after being passed by Maldonado and the two Force India cars within the space of a few corners, he went into the pits. Schumacher was also on older tyres and pitted for new ones three laps later, rejoining in 11th place, just ahead of Webber. The race at the front of the field took yet another twist when, on lap 41, Grosjean who was running within a second of Alonso had to retire with an alternator failure suspected to be similar to that of Vettel's. This left Alonso with a 3-second lead over Hamilton, who was now under pressure from Räikkönen, with Maldonado up to 4th now ahead of the Force India duo of Hülkenberg and di Resta, the latter trying a one-stopper. He was soon under attack from Pérez, who along with Button, had recovered back up to seventh and eighth.

Alonso continued to lead comfortably at the front, with Hamilton continuing to hold off Räikkönen for second though the latter rarely allowed the gap to go over a second. Maldonado, Hülkenberg and di Resta began to spread out, and the action behind was from Schumacher and Webber, who on new softer tyres were going around 2 seconds quicker than those in front of them. The duo picked off Senna, before closing in on and passing Button on lap 49. As the tyres started to wear out for the other drivers, they fell into the clutches of Schumacher and Webber, who passed Pérez three laps later, and di Resta after another lap to move up into 6th and 7th respectively. Hülkenberg was next up and he too was dealt with by the duo on the penultimate lap, moving Schumacher into 5th and Webber into 6th, but it was not going to stay that way.

Hamilton in second, in his attempts to hold off Räikkönen had pushed his tyres too much, and they started to wear towards the end of the race. Räikkönen patiently bided his time before passing Hamilton on lap 55 with two laps left, when Hamilton's tyres were worn out. Hamilton was now under attack from Maldonado, whose pace was strong enough for him to stay out of the reach of Schumacher and Webber. Maldonado attacked Hamilton at turn 1 on the penultimate lap, but some strong defensive driving by Hamilton meant that he kept the place for then despite his worn tyres. Maldonado tried again on the run down to turn 13 using DRS, with Hamilton taking the inside line and forcing Maldonado off the track, and as Maldonado tried to rejoin, he clipped the kerb for the next turn and hit Hamilton, forcing him into the wall and out of the race. Maldonado himself lost his front wing, and dropped back down the order. The race was won by Alonso, who became the first driver to win 2 races this year, and coupled with Vettel's and Hamilton's retirement also took the championship lead. Räikkönen took second and Schumacher was promoted to third, his first podium since his return to F1 and the last podium of his career. Webber was 4th ahead of Hülkenberg, with Rosberg charging up to 6th on new tyres by passing di Resta and Button in the last two laps. Pérez suffered more tyre problems than others and crossed the line 9th, with Maldonado who continued on without his front wing was still able to take the final point in 10th. However, he was given a 20-second time penalty for his collision with Hamilton and was thus demoted to 12th, with his teammate Senna thus taking the final point. The race marked the oldest average age of podium finishers in the 21st century with 35 years, 8 months, and 8 days.

Post-race
Jean-Éric Vergne was given a ten-place grid penalty for the next race for causing an avoidable collision with Heikki Kovalainen. He was also fined 25,000 euros for driving dangerously when he had a puncture. Kamui Kobayashi was awarded a five-place grid penalty at the next race for the collision with Felipe Massa.

This event would prove to be the last held at the circuit. It has proved unpopular with drivers and fans for its unimaginative layout and lack of suitable overtaking places, leading to mundane races. From 2013, the Spanish Grand Prix was due to alternate between Barcelona and Valencia, but Valencia later dropped out of the contract to host the race.

Classification

Qualifying

Notes
 — Timo Glock was unable to participate in the qualifying session due to illness. Glock was later denied medical clearance to take part in the race.

Race

Notes
 — Following his collision with Hamilton on the penultimate lap, Maldonado received a 20-second penalty for "rejoining the track in an unsafe manner". His penalty dropped him from 10th to 12th.

Championship standings after the race 

Drivers' Championship standings

Constructors' Championship standings

 Note: Only the top five positions are included for both sets of standings.

See also 
 2012 Valencia GP2 Series round
 2012 Valencia GP3 Series round

References

External links

European Grand Prix
Europe
European Grand Prix
21st century in Valencia
European Grand Prix